The  1897 World Figure Skating Championship was an annual figure skating competition sanctioned by the International Skating Union in which figure skaters compete for the title of World Champion.

The competition took place from February 13th to 14th in Stockholm, Sweden. All judges came from the same country – Sweden.

Gustav Hügel won the competition despite a tendon strain. He got this injury when he was training in Hamburg, Germany.

Results

Men

Judges:
 Mr. H. Cederblom 
 Mr. O. Wollert 
 Mr. C. F. Mellin 
 Mr. L. Lindqvist 
 Mr. Ivar Hult

Sources
 Result List provided by the ISU

World Figure Skating Championships
World Figure Skating Championships, 1897
Figure skating in Sweden
International figure skating competitions hosted by Sweden
World Figure Skating Championships
World Figure Skating Championships
1890s in Stockholm